Magdala Park is a recreational area. The park is adjacent to Lane Cove River, Sydney, Australia. The park also has forest areas, where recreational activities are taken up. The football field playing surfaces are maintained by the City of Ryde Council. The park has a canteen, seating and lights.

Used by

References

See also
 Football NSW

Parks in Sydney